Kyrkjebygda or Kyrkjebygdi is the administrative centre of Åseral municipality in Agder county, Norway. The village is located on a small flat plain in a valley at the northern end of the lake Øre at the confluence of the rivers Logna and Monn. The Monn river valley heads north-northwest to the village of Ljosland and the Logna river valley heads north-northeast to the villages of Åknes and Bortelid.

The name Kyrkjebygda literally means "church village" in the Norwegian language. It has this name since it has been the site of Åseral Church for centuries.

References

Villages in Agder
Åseral